Tomé de Sousa (1503–1579) was the first governor-general of the Portuguese colony of Brazil from 1549 until 1553. He was a nobleman and soldier born in Rates, Póvoa de Varzim. Sousa was born a noble and participated in military expeditions in Africa, fought the Moors and commanded the nau Conceição to Portuguese India, part of the armada of Fernão de Andrade.

Sousa was the first knight commander of the medieval Monastery of Rates, re-established in 1100 AD and dissolved in the 16th century.

Before Brazil 
Born into nobility, Sousa was fathered by a Prior and a descendant of King Afonso III, Dom João de Sousa. Despite being born illegitimately, he worked for the royal court from a young age with the support of Antônio de Ataíde, his cousin and the count of Castenheira. Before becoming governor-general of Brazil, Sousa fought as a soldier in Morocco and North Africa, and traveled for the Indian spice trade. In 1536, Sousa was recognized by the Portuguese government for his service, and he was knighted three years later for military achievement.

Sousa in Brazil
Sousa sailed for Brazil with six ships, soldiers, and one thousand citizens and missionaries. His objectives were to fend off French pirates and evangelize local Indians in the name of Christianity with the goal of strengthening Portugal's royal power in Brazil. Sousa was the agent in charge of restoring the king's authority in Colonial Brazil. Up until this point, Brazil had been neglected by Portugal, which was putting all of its resources into the spice trade in India. There was a decline in the spice trade and increasing threats around Brazil's borders by the surrounding Spanish colonies, which prompted Portugal to intervene. As part of this mission, Sousa approached the Donatário of Bahia, Francisco Pereira Coutinho,  to buy what would become capital city of Salvador at Bahia on the Atlantic coast between São Paulo and Pernambuco. The new capital was in a better defended location and fortified by Sousa himself. It was supposed to bring together the twelve pre-existing settlements, though Sousa traversed the bordering areas in an effort to promote his idea of justice and to diminish what the Portuguese saw as the lawlessness and chaos of the region. He led other Portuguese forces by sending officials to other Brazilian captaincies to ensure proper procedure and to regulate administration. He planned on making the colony a strong military base to protect the Portuguese settlers from Indian or other outside forces. He accomplished this by expelling hostile natives for safe colonization. He brought 1,000 colonists and soldiers with him on an expedition to Brazil, including four hundred degredados - "men banished from Portugal for some minor criminal activity." Among the colonists were six Jesuits, the first in Brazil, whom he assisted in the Christianization of the natives and helped to reaffirm the King's rule over the colonies. Sousa's relationship with Manuel da Nóbrega and the Jesuit missionaries allowed him to keep watch on other territories and Indians. Along with those he brought, Sousa made land grants to other settlers now that the territory was better protected. He was successful in decreasing the hostilities waged against the colonists by native people, in part through diplomatic avenues but primarily through his use of cruel and often extreme punishment. Along with Christianization, Sousa established days of market to encourage trade between settlers and Indians. Throughout his time in office, Sousa fortified Portuguese territories and established new communities with churches and schools. He introduced livestock and established sugarcane production. He is also credited for establishing the first bishopric of Brazil with Dom Pero Fernandes Sardinha. In 1553, Sousa worked far outside of his own territory of Salvador. Sousa strengthened the economy and defenses of São Vicente. He also went on to establish the village of Itanhaém. That year, Sousa ventured home, leaving Salvador in the hands of Duarte da Costa.

Return to Portugal
In 1552, Sousa suggested that Rio de Janeiro might be a potential area for settlement and in 1553 he returned to Portugal to work with the King, acting as his adviser on Brazilian affairs. Sousa also helped to attract settlers to Brazil by installing municipal organizations, similar to the ones in Portugal, into the cities. He also managed to appoint local officials over the captaincies and strengthened tactical areas around the coast that would be beneficial to the safety of the citizens.

Descendants
According to the traditions of the de Souza family of West Africa, their founding patriarch - Francisco Félix de Sousa, the Chacha of Ouidah - was a direct descendant of Tomé de Sousa. He arrived in Dahomey after leaving Brazil, and went on to become an African chieftain after serving as a powerful slave trader and royal advisor. With his harem of black consorts, he had a brace of children whose lineal descendants would go on to be prominent in the region. President Paul-Emile de Souza of Benin and his niece Chantal de Souza Boni Yayi, the first lady to President Boni Yayi of Benin, are arguably the most notable of them.

Further reading
Crow, John A. The Epic of Latin America, Fourth Edition. University of California Press. 1992

References

External links
http://www.britannica.com/EBchecked/topic/555522/Tome-de-Sousa

1503 births
1579 deaths
People from Póvoa de Varzim
Governors-General of Brazil
Portuguese soldiers
Portuguese colonization of the Americas
Portuguese colonial governors and administrators
Colonial Brazil
16th-century Portuguese people
Brazilian city founders
Portuguese city founders